Tethea or, the poplar lutestring, is a moth of the family Drepanidae. It was first described by Michael Denis and Ignaz Schiffermüller in 1775. The species can be found in Europe, northern and eastern Asia and Japan. The imago resembles Tethea ocularis.

The wingspan is 38–43 mm. The moths flies from April to August depending on the location.

The larvae feed on willow and poplar, mainly Populus tremula.

Subspecies
Tethea or or (Europe to Turkey)
Tethea or akanensis (Matsumura, 1933) (Japan)
Tethea or terrosa (Graeser, 1888) (Russia, Korea, Mongolia, China: Heilongjiang, Jilin, Liaoning, Inner Mongolia, Beijing, Shanxi, Shaanxi, Ningxia, Gansu, Xinjiang)

External links

Poplar lutestring on UKMoths
Lepidoptera of Belgium
Lepiforum.de
Vlindernet.nl 

Thyatirinae
Moths described in 1775
Drepanid moths of Great Britain
Moths of Europe
Moths of Asia
Taxa named by Michael Denis
Taxa named by Ignaz Schiffermüller